Ruchen may refer to several mountains:

Ruchen (Jura Mountains), Jura Chain, Switzerland
Gross Ruchen, Glarus Alps, Switzerland
Chli Ruchen, Glarus Alps, Switzerland
Ruchen is the highest peak of Mürtschenstock, Glarus Alps, Switzerland
alternativ name for Foostock, Glarus Alps, Switzerland
Ruchen, one of the summit of the Glärnisch massif, Schwyzer Alps, Switzerland